Malmaison may refer to:

 Château de Malmaison, last residence of Napoleon, Rueil-Malmaison, a western suburb of Paris, France
  Greenwood LeFlore's home, Greenwood, Mississippi, USA
 Malmaison (hotel chain), a UK hotel chain
 Malmaison Prison in Romania, where enemies of the Communist regime such as Maria Antonescu and Silviu Craciunas were held

 Rueil-Malmaison, a town in France and suburb of Paris